Midnight Syndicate is the debut album by the band Midnight Syndicate.  Released in 1997, it is very different from their later releases. While containing some of their signature style, they experiment with rap, techno, rock and other genres.

Track listing

Additional personnel 
 Scott Angus — drums (tracks 1, 4, 6, 7, 11, 15); keyboards (track 6)
 Dennis Carleton — electric guitar (tracks 4, 7, 9, 11, 15)
 Christopher Robichaud — vocals (tracks 9, 13)
 Anthony Weems — vocals (track 2)
 Rashan Poole — vocals (track 2)
 Jami Douglas — vocals (track 6)
 David Herpy — saxophone (track 15)

1997 debut albums
Midnight Syndicate albums